The  (formerly but still referred to as the ) is a TV tower in Nagoya, central Japan.

History 
It is the oldest TV tower in Japan, and was completed in 1954. It is located in the centre of Hisaya Ōdori Park. The tower is 180 metres high, and has two main observation decks at the heights of 90 metres (the indoor Sky Deck) and 100 metres (the outdoor Sky Balcony). The tower also includes a restaurant and gallery at 30 metres. Nagoya TV Tower closely resembles the Eiffel Tower.
Recently, the tower became known under the nickname of "Thunder Tower" due to the nighttime illumination. The tower also included a bowling alley at the top. In May 2021, the tower was given a new name, the Chubu Electric MIRAI TOWER.

In popular culture 
The famous movie monster, Godzilla pulled the tower down in Mothra vs. Godzilla (1964), and twenty-eight years later, it was destroyed again in the 1992 remake, Godzilla vs. Mothra. This time around, it is demolished by the monster Battra, when the creature attacks Nagoya.

In the anime Seraph of the End, the tower makes a brief appearance in episode 5 of season 2, where characters Yoichi Saotome and Shinya Hiragi use the tower as their sniping point in their mission to assassinate vampire noble Lucal Wesker.

See also 

 Tokyo Tower

References

External links 

 Official Website 
 

Buildings and structures in Nagoya
Communication towers in Japan
Landmarks in Japan
Towers completed in 1954
Tourist attractions in Nagoya
Observation towers in Japan
Restaurant towers
1954 establishments in Japan
Sakae, Nagoya